The 1969 24 Hours of Le Mans was the 37th Grand Prix of Endurance, and took place on 14 and 15 June 1969. It was the eighth round of the 1969 World Sportscar Championship season.

It was the last year with the traditional "Le Mans" style start, in which the drivers run across the track to enter their cars, start them, and race away. The previous year, Willy Mairesse crashed on the first lap while trying to properly close the door of his car at speed on the Mulsanne Straight; the crash would have been avoided entirely if not for the Le Mans-style start, and it ended Mairesse's racing career. During the 1969 start, eventual winner Jacky Ickx famously staged his own one-man protest by walking to his car, and taking his time doing up his belts. Meanwhile, privateer John Woolfe ran with the other drivers, flipped his car on the opening lap near Maison Blanche corner, and not yet strapped in properly, was killed when the car broke up.

The race was one of the most exciting in the event's history. Porsche had already wrapped up the World Sportscar Championship, and were strong favourites to achieve their first outright win. More than one-third of the starting cars were Porsches, and the mighty 917s held the lead for 90% of the race. But when the Elford/Attwood car's gearbox broke at 11 a.m., it was the Ford of Ickx and Jackie Oliver that took over the lead. The race ended in a 3-hour sprint, with the Ford battling the pursuing Porsche 908 of Hans Herrmann and Gérard Larrousse non-stop. In the end, the Ford GT40 – the same chassis that had won the previous year – took the chequered flag by just 120 metres after 24 hours.

Regulations
Heeding the calls of race promoters worried about diminishing fields, the FIA sought to fix things by reducing the minimum production figure to run in Group 4 from 50 to 25. Even though they had an unlimited engine capacity, it was reasoned that it would not be a difference as the cars were not usually as competitive as the Group 6 Prototypes. This however, left a large flaw in the system for big manufacturers with the resources to exploit the regulations. Porsche were able to construct 25 chassis of their new 917 prototype, with its 4.5-litre engine, to get it homologated for Group 4.

This year the Automobile Club de l'Ouest (ACO) brought the start-time forward to 2pm, to allow time for the largely French crowd to still be able to get to vote in the Presidential Elections on the Sunday afternoon. New Armco crash barriers were installed around the circuit, including on the Mulsanne Straight, where there was previously no protection from the trees, houses and embankments in the event of a car leaving the track. Sandbanks were replaced by barriers.

Entries
Into the second year of the new 3-litre regulations, the initial entries closed with 109 applications – the biggest number in the past decade. However, after the requisite culling 60 cars were accepted, but a number of withdrawals meant only 51 practiced with non-starters reducing the final grid to only 45, the smallest field in the decade. After a dominant season to date, Porsche had already won the Sportscar Championship, and arrived with easily the biggest representation with 16 cars, a third of the field.

Porsche had already wrapped up the championship after the seven races to date. Starting in July 1968, Porsche made a surprising and very expensive effort to conceive, design and build a whole new car for the Group 4 Sport category with one underlying goal: to win its first overall victory at Le Mans. In only ten months, the first Porsche 917 prototype was developed with a fibreglass body and Porsche's first 12-cylinder engine. Bored out to 4.5-litres, made from titanium, magnesium and exotic alloys, it produced a mighty 520 bhp. The 917 included another feature which would prove to be controversial in the week leading up to the race: movable aerodynamic wings linked to the suspension. These were banned by the CSI (Commission Sportive Internationale – the FIA's regulatory body) at the Monaco GP in May as dangerous. Porsche team manager, Rico Steinemann, protested that their test-sessions had shown the car was inherently unstable without them and that the cars had been homologated for Group 4 with the flaps. A last-minute decision the day before Le Mans by the FISA allowed them to race, although the 908s had to lose the flaps as they had previously run without them. Team Matra was particularly upset by this decision, but in a statement said they did not intend to protest. It was widely believed that if the ban was again reinstated because of a protest by other teams, Porsche would have pulled out of the 1969 race entirely.

By May the necessary 25 chassis were completed for homologation, intended to be sold to private racing teams at $35,000 each. The first was purchased by a private interest by the time of the Le Mans race, that of Briton John Woolfe. The cars had their first race at Spa, and three works entries were at Le Mans in langheck (longtail) form for Vic Elford/Richard Attwood and Rolf Stommelen/Kurt Ahrens, with Herbert Linge in the reserve car.

In the Prototype class, Porsche had three works 908s, also in langheck form, including regular team drivers Gerhard Mitter / Udo Schütz. This season's version was at least 20% lighter than the 1968 car. The new 908/2 spyder version that had been very successful through the season was run by the team's lead drivers, Jo Siffert and Brian Redman, through Siffert's sponsor, Hart Ski with strong works support. There were also a pair of privateer 910s in the 2-litre Prototype class.

After a tight season last year, Ford were no longer as competitive as their Porsche rivals. Although the GT40 was showing its age, five were entered. John Wyer's J.W. Automotive, managed by David Yorke, chose not to run the disappointing Group 6 Mirage M2s and instead entered two of the cars they ran in the previous year's race. They kept their regular driving combinations: Jacky Ickx / Jackie Oliver and David Hobbs / Mike Hailwood. There were also entries for Alan Mann Racing and a race-debut for Reinhold Joest, as a driver.

After an inauspicious debut in 1967, the Lola T70 Mk 3 had gradually improved, and with sufficient production now completed to put it into the Sports category, it could run the far more reliable, race-proven, Chevrolet 5-litre V8 engine. The new Mk 3B, designed by Eric Broadley, was the first racing car to use the new ultralight, ultra-strong, carbon-fibre. A victory in the opening championship round at Daytona for Roger Penske's team boded well. Lola withdrew its entries after Paul Hawkins burned to death in an accident in May driving a Lola at the RAC Tourist Trophy. Without the works team, it was Scuderia Filipinetti who ran a car for Jo Bonnier/Masten Gregory.

The SEFAC-Ferrari works team returned to Le Mans after a year's absence, with the new 312P prototype, a design strongly akin to the Can-Am 612P. It ran a 3-litre V12 engine based on the Ferrari Formula 1 engine, developing 430 bhp. Two cars were entered, for former race-winners Chris Amon and Pedro Rodriguez, partnered with hill-climb specialist Peter Schetty and David Piper respectively. The North American Racing Team (NART) once again had three different options entered in the Sports category: its 1965 race-winning 275LM car was back, with a new 365 GTB/4 in the over-2-litre class, and a Dino 206 S in the under-2-litre class.

Alpine returned with its A220, Gordini had now fuel-injected the Renault 3-litre to produce a still-underwhelming 330 bhp. Mauro Bianchi, badly injured at the 1968 race, was now the works-team manager after he failed the medical at the Monza round. As well as the three works cars, there was one for their regular customer team, the Ecurie Savin-Calberson. The two teams, alongside another French privateer team, Trophée Le Mans, ran four of the A210 in the smaller Prototype classes including one for French ski-champions Jean-Claude Killy and Bob Wollek.

After a strong showing in the 1968 race, the French team Matra gave up its Formula 1 development (leaving it to Ken Tyrrell's Matra International) to focus on its sports-car program. Aerodynamic engineer Robert Choulet designed a low-drag coupé specially for the Le Mans, the Matra 640, bearing a resemblance to his Panhard CD designs but with the Matra 3-litre V12 engine. Not ready in time for the March test weekend, Matra was able to get a special test in April. Henri Pescarolo took to the track, but at the first kilometres on the Mulsanne Straight, the car got airborne, doing a 360° loop, before smashing into roadside trees and catching fire. Pescarolo was pulled out alive but had two broken vertebrae and severe burns to his face and arms. The project was cancelled; however development was also proceeding on the 630. This led to a new open-top car, the 650. Only one had been finished (just before scrutineering ) for Jean-Pierre Beltoise / Piers Courage, while two former 630 chassis were converted (christened 630/650) for Johnny Servoz-Gavin/Herbert Müller and 'Nanni' Galli/Robin Widdows. There was also an MS630 for Nino Vaccarella/Jean Guichet who had won the 1964 race together for Ferrari. Meanwhile, Pescarolo did race commentary for French TV from his hospital bed.

Aside from the Lola, British cars were limited to the small manufacturers. The Chevron B8 had been homologated into Group 4, with a 2-litre BMW engine. Donald Healey had returned with its SR 2-litre prototype, improved from extensive testing at Silverstone. The Unipower GT had a 1275cc Mini Cooper S engine, while the Piper GTR had a 1300cc Ford engine. Smallest car in the field was the Abarth 1000SP

After their excellent result in the previous year's race, Alfa Romeo's Autodelta works team was favourites for a class-win. However, the team withdrew after the death of their lead-driver and 1968 race-winner, Lucien Bianchi, at the March test weekend trialing the new Tipo 33/3– the third driver death for the team in testing after Jean Rolland and Leo Cella in 1968. Instead it fell to the Belgian customer team VDS to run two of the older model Tipo 33/2, one with a 2.5-litre V8 engine.

The GT category was still a limited field. Scuderia Filipinetti had a lock on the over 2-litre class, with both entries – a Corvette Stingray and Ferrari 275 GTB/C. The under 2-litre class was only contested by 911 privateers – the Porsche already proving to be the car of choice in this class.

Alfa-Romeo and Abarth factory entries dropped out because of a customs strike, and Ferrari North America also scratched some entries.

Practice
The test weekend was held on 29/30 March and was marred by the fatal accident to Lucien Bianchi in the new 3-litre Alfa Romeo. The car crashed into a telephone pole and a transformer station and exploded. Bianchi was killed instantly by the impact.

From the test weekend Rolf Stommelen, in the brand new Porsche 917, recorded a 3:30.7 over three seconds quicker than Servoz-Gavin in the Matra. Paul Hawkins in a works Lola was third-quickest with a 3:35.2.

The power of the new Porsche 917 was shown by Stommelen on the first night of practice when he put in a blistering lap of 3:22.9 to take pole position. This was over 2 seconds faster than the sister car of Vic Elford. It was also 0.7 seconds faster than the lap record held by the big Mark IVs of Denny Hulme and Mario Andretti in 1967 (set without the Ford chicane present). Despite a top speed over 20 km/h slower than the Fords, this was achieved with the great advances in downforce. In the end, Porsche chose to only race two of their three 917s. Woolfe had busted his engine in practise grabbing 1st instead of 3rd but was able to get a replacement one from Porsche.

The Porsche 908s of Jo Siffert and Rudi Lins were third and fourth then came the Ferraris of Rodriguez and Amon with 3:35 laps. The best Matra was Servoz-Gavin in 11th (3:36.4) and Ickx put the top Ford in 13th. The underpowered Alpines were well off the pace of their contemporaries with qualifying laps in the 3:45s putting them midfield. The top 2-litre car was the Gosselin/Bourgoignie Alfa Romeo in 27th (4:09.8) with the first 911 doing 4:28.2 to qualify 35th.

NART had a bad practice when its Dino collided with its Daytona stablemate approaching the Mulsanne corner, putting both cars out for the race.
A curious incident happened in practice when Bonnier pitted his Lola and got out covered in blood and feathers. Apparently he had hit a bird and it had been sucked through a cooling vent into the cockpit. With the proviso that all cars had to qualify within 85% of the pole-sitting car's average speed for safety reasons, it meant that several cars failed to qualify.

Race

Start

After a sunny week, race-day was overcast, but dry with a huge crowd in attendance for the start. At the drop of the flag it was Stommelen, with a big power-slide, who was first under the Dunlop bridge. In yet another deadly year of motorsport Jacky Ickx, mindful of the accident that had ended the career of his former teammate Willy Mairesse's on the first lap of the previous year's race staged his own one-man protest. He rebelled against the traditional Le Mans starting procedure to run across the track to their cars, climb in, start the car, and move the car as quickly as possible to pull away from the grid. Instead Ickx walked slowly to his car, properly put on his safety belts, and only then moved the car. Doing so effectively relegated Ickx to the back of the starting grid.

His concern was borne out almost immediately. On the very first lap, the twitchy handling of the Porsche 917 and the inexperience of one of its drivers resulted in a major accident: the death of British gentleman-driver John Woolfe. Woolfe's purchased his 917 for £16000 (US$40,000) only days earlier and was quoted by a colleague as having said its power "scared the pants off me". Porsche racing manager Rico Steinemann was quoted as having pled with Woolfe before the race to allow his works-driver teammate Herbert Linge to drive the first stint, but he demurred. Woolfe crashed approaching Maison Blanche when he got two wheels on the grass and lost control. He was thrown free of the car as it spun, rolled, hit an embankment, and exploded. Woolfe was taken by helicopter to a nearby hospital, but was dead on arrival.

The nearly full fuel tank from Woolfe's car became dislodged and landed, burning, in front of the oncoming Ferrari 312P of Chris Amon. Amon ran over it, and Woolfe's fuel tank jammed underneath causing Amon's to rupture and explode as well. Amon set off the on-board fire extinguisher and was uninjured but forced to retire the car. Debris virtually blocked the road and a number of cars were affected including the Healey, Gardner's Ford and Jabouille's Alpine. The rest of the field was virtually halted and slowly picked its way through the carnage.

Stommelen led the race to the first pitstops, leading a train of five Porsches (Stommelen, Elford, Siffert, Mitter, Herrmann). Bonnier's Lola was sixth, but then Stommelen was delayed by oil leaking from the transmission. Gardner brought the Alan Mann Ford in several times with overheating because debris from the accident had holed the radiator. Jo Siffert and Brian Redman took over the lead until they too were crippled by an oil-leak in the gearbox after four hours. This moved the Elford/Attwood 917 to the lead, ahead of the other 908 team cars of Mitter/Schütz, Herrmann/Larrousse and Lins/Kauhsen, pursued by the Matra of Beltoise/Courage then the Wyer Ford of Ickx/Oliver in 6th. In the sixth hour a number of cars had problems: Herrmann was delayed for 20 minutes repairing the front suspension with parts from Siffert's car (dropping to 12th), and the Matra lost two laps fixing a faulty rear light. The leading Alpine of de Cortanze/Vinatier (running 11th) lost a wheel at Indianapolis corner. With a large crowd of observers he 'fortuitously' found the right tools on the grass verge but dropped well back. The Matra was being raced very hard and by dusk, at 9pm, had made it up to second only to be delayed repeatedly by slow pitwork.

Night

As night fell, the three works Porsches were ahead of the two Wyer Fords and also running in the top-3 of the Index of Performance. Bonnier and Gregory were having a good run in the Lola, running sixth, until overheating issues at 11pm forced a 3-hour pitstop to change heads and gaskets. 'Taf' Gosselin got it wrong approaching the Ford chicane, going straight on and crashing although the driver escaped without injury. The big Alpines had been plagued by engine issues, and just after midnight the last one suffered head gasket failure. At the 2am halfway mark Elford/Attwood had done 192 laps, four ahead of Schütz/Mitter and Lins/Kauhsen (187), then back to the Fords (both 184 laps) and the Vaccarella/Guichet Matra (183). Disaster struck the Porsches at 2.45am when the team cars of Schütz (running 3rd) and Larrousse (now 8th) collided at the Mulsanne kink. Schütz's car rolled, burst into flames and almost broke in half. However the driver escaped uninjured. Larrousse's car made it to the pits with bodywork damage and was quickly repaired.

Morning
Dawn saw the 917 of Elford/Attwood driving within itself and still leading the 908 of Lins/Kauhsen. The Wyer Fords were 3rd and 4th with the Herrmann/Larrousse Porsche motoring back through the field, up to 5th. The remaining 312P Ferrari was in 8th with ongoing oil-leak issues splitting the three remaining Matras until it finally retired just after 5am. Through the night the Matras had had their problems: Galli spent an hour getting new fuel pumps fitted and Courage had a broken headlight then clipped a Porsche 911 on Mulsanne, getting bodywork damage. But come the daylight he and Beltoise pushed hard to close in on the Fords. At 6am, as a heavy mist came down over the circuit the leaders had a 5-lap lead and there were only 19 cars still running.

The 1.5L Alpine, of Killy/Wollek, had been running very quickly and steadily moving up the order to as high as 11th leading the medium-engined cars and the Thermal Efficiency Index. But soon after 8am it was retired with broken suspension much to the disappointment of the French crowd.

Then around 10.15am, with barely 3 hours left to run, the two leading Porsches both came in with unscheduled pitstops. The mechanics examined them but to no avail – the Lins/Kauhsen car stopped on Mulsanne with a broken clutch. The 917 limped on for another half-hour before a cracked weld in its gearbox stopped it for good. Within a matter of minutes, the Ickx/Oliver Ford now found itself in the lead. The Herrmann/Larrousse Porsche had been driving hard making up time and when the other Wyer Ford lost two laps changing its rear brakes it moved up to second place.

Finish and post-race

Going into the final hour after their final pit-stops, both teams put their best drivers in the cars. Ickx and Herrmann were now on the same lap, barely 10 seconds apart. The Porsche 908 had fading brakes and an engine now 400rpm down on power and the Ford GT40 suffered from exhaust problems, making for a very even contest. In a dramatic finish, Ickx and Herrmann repeatedly overtook each other. Ickx knew if he led onto the Mulsanne straight, Herrmann would pass, but he could slipstream past him back again before the Mulsanne corner and then hold a lead for the rest of a lap. But by strange timing the cars crossed the line with less than a minute to go and had to go around one more time. The Ford had only ever done 23 laps on a tank of fuel, but now needed an extra lap. So on the last lap, Ickx let Herrmann pass him early on the Mulsanne Straight, faking a lack of power from fuel starvation. Ickx used the slipstream of Herrmann to pass him again just before the end of the 5 km straight.
Ickx and Oliver won with the GT40 chassis #1075 (nicknamed the 'Old Lady'), the same car that had won the previous year. This was only the second time the same car had won two years in a row; a Bentley Speed Six had done it in 1929 and 1930. Ickx dedicated the team's victory to Lucien Bianchi, who had been killed earlier in the year, and had helped the Wyer team win the Le Mans the previous year.

The Hobbs and Hailwood Wyer Ford, after its delay, finished third four laps behind, just ahead of the Matra of Beltoise/Courage. The older Matra of Vaccarella/Guichet was 5th a distant 9 laps behind and the German Ford of Kelleners/Joest 6th an even further 18 laps behind them.
The veteran NART Ferrari 275LM finished eighth, covering  less than its race-winning performance in 1965. With eight cars entered, Alpine had great expectations but the only one to finish was the smallest: the 1-litre A210 of Serpaggi/Ethuin finished 12th, 80 laps behind the Ford, but winning the lucrative Index of Performance covering almost 30% more distance than its small-engine target. For the first time since 1926 there were no all-British entries among the finishers.

So, once again Porsche, Matra and Renault left without their coveted Le Mans victory. It was the first win of six for Jacky Ickx (a record that stood until 2005 when beaten by Tom Kristensen). He had walked across the track at the start line and still won. The ACO's response to that was proactive and the iconic Le Mans start was discontinued. Ironically Ickx himself had a road accident near Chartres while driving to Paris on the Monday morning after the race. A car pulled in front of his Porsche 911. Ickx's car ended up crushed against a utility pole. Ickx unbuckled his seat belt and stepped unharmed from the wrecked Porsche.

Later in the month, Enzo Ferrari sold sufficient stock holdings in his company to the Fiat S.p.A. to raise their share to 50%.
In another bad year for motorsport accidents, the Porsche works team lost two of their drivers at August's German Grand Prix Gerhard Mitter, driving an F2 BMW was killed in practise. Then Vic Elford had a major accident on the first lap with Mario Andretti. He survived but had broken his arm in three places. The race had also marked the return to racing of Henri Pescarolo, in an F2 Matra, after his test-accident.

Finally, Jacques Loste, race director of the ACO since 1957, retired later in the year. His successor was the manufacturer/engineer, and Le Mans veteran, Charles Deutsch.

Official results

Finishers
Results taken from Quentin Spurring's book, officially licensed by the ACO Class Winners are in Bold text.

Did Not Finish

Did Not Start

Class Winners

 Note: setting a new Distance Record.

Index of Thermal Efficiency

 Note: Only the top nine positions are included in this set of standings.

Index of Performance
Taken from Moity's book.

 Note: Only the top ten positions are included in this set of standings. A score of 1.00 means meeting the minimum distance for the car, and a higher score is exceeding the nominal target distance.

Statistics
Taken from Quentin Spurring's book, officially licensed by the ACO
 Fastest Lap in practice – R. Stommelen, #14 Porsche 917 LH – 3:22.9secs; 
 Fastest Lap – V. Elford, #12 Porsche 917 LH – 3:27.2secs; 
 Winning Distance – 
 Winner's Average Speed – 
 Attendance – almost 400 000

International Championship for Makes Standings
As calculated after Le Mans, Round 8 of 10

Citations

References
 Armstrong, Douglas – English editor (1969)    Automobile Year #17 1969–70    Lausanne: Edita S.A.
 Clarke, R.M. – editor (1997) Le Mans 'The Ford and Matra Years 1966–1974'    Cobham, Surrey: Brooklands Books  
 Clausager, Anders (1982) Le Mans London: Arthur Barker Ltd  
 Henry, Alan (1988) Fifty Famous Motor Races Northamptonshire: Patrick Stephen Ltd  
 Laban, Brian (2001) Le Mans 24 Hours London: Virgin Books   
 Moity, Christian (1974) The Le Mans 24 Hour Race 1949–1973 Radnor, Pennsylvania: Chilton Book Co  
 Parker, Paul (2016) Sports Car Racing in Camera Vol 2 1960–69 Wincanton: Behemoth Publishing   
 Spurring, Quentin (2010) Le Mans 1960–69 Yeovil, Somerset: Haynes Publishing

External links
 Racing Sports Cars – Le Mans 24 Hours 1969 entries, results, technical detail. Retrieved 4 May 2018
  Le Mans History – Le Mans History, hour-by-hour (incl. pictures, YouTube links). Retrieved 4 May 2018
  World Sports Racing Prototypes – results, reserve entries & chassis numbers. Retrieved 4 May 2018
  Team Dan – results & reserve entries, explaining driver listings. Retrieved 4 May 2018
  Unique Cars & Parts – results & reserve entries. Retrieved 4 May 2018
  Formula 2 – Le Mans results & reserve entries. Retrieved 4 May 2018
  Motorsport Memorial – details of the fatal accidents. Retrieved 4 May 2018
  YouTube – Colour footage with music overlaid (5mins).  Retrieved 15 May 2018
  YouTube – Brief interview with Henri Pescarolo about his crash in testing (90sec).  Retrieved 15 May 2018
  YouTube – Brief interview with Frank Gardner about John Woolfe crash (30sec).  Retrieved 15 May 2018
  YouTube – B/w footage, in Dutch, news report (1min).  Retrieved 15 May 2018

In media
La Ronde Infernale: Le Mans 1969 (commissioned by Castrol)

24 Hours of Le Mans races
Le Mans
1969 in French motorsport